Tremembé is a municipality in the Brazilian state of São Paulo.

Tremembé may also refer to:

 Tremembé (district of São Paulo), a district of São Paulo
 Tremembé people, an indigenous people of Brazil
 Tremembé language, the extinct language of the Tremembé people
 Jaçanã-Tremembé, a subprefecture of São Paulo, containing Tremembé district